Dame Beatrice Annie Godwin DBE (6 July 1897 – 11 January 1992), known as Anne Godwin, was a British trade unionist.

Early life
Born in July 1897 in Farncombe, Surrey, Godwin's father was a draper. She attended school in Godalming until age 15, in 1912, when she left to start working as a counting house clerk in London's West End. In 1916, she joined the Army Pay Office as a civilian clerk, earning 16 shillings a week. Other women working at the office organised to unsuccessfully request a higher salary from the Army Paymaster. She joined the Association of Women Clerks and Secretaries (AWCS) after moving to an engineer's office in 1920.

By 1928, she was a trade union organiser. Women civil servants belonged to two different classes of unions, back then. Temporaries joined the AWCS, and after being made permanent they joined the NAWCS (National Association of Women Civil Servants).

Later life
In 1940, a majority of AWCS members voted in favour of amalgamation. The two unions joined and became known as the Clerical and Administrative Workers Union. Anne Godwin was Assistant General Secretary, and edited the union's journal, entitled The Clerk. From 1961 to 1962, she served as one of the first women to become President of the Trades Union Congress (TUC), Britain's main organisation of trades unions, following Margaret Bondfield, Anne Loughlin and Florence Hancock.

Appointed a Dame Commander of the Order of the British Empire in 1962, Dame Anne Godwin was the guest speaker at the 1980 Conference when the union celebrated its 90th anniversary.

References

External links
Oxford Biography Index (subscription required)

Further reading 
 Middleton, L. (1977). Women in the labour movement: The British experience. Early years in the trade unions / Anne Godwin. London: Croom Helm.

1897 births
1992 deaths
British activists
British women activists
Dames Commander of the Order of the British Empire
General Secretaries of the Association of Professional, Executive, Clerical and Computer Staff
People from Surrey
Members of the General Council of the Trades Union Congress
Presidents of the Trades Union Congress
English women trade unionists